is the fourth single by Japanese singer Anna Tsuchiya, released on 10 January 2007 under the pseudonym "Anna Tsuchiya inspi' Nana (Black Stones)" on the Mad Pray Records Label, a sub-label to Avex. It spent six weeks in the Oricon singles chart, reaching #7 on 22 January 2007. The song was used as an ending theme to the anime-adaption of the Japanese manga Nana. It was Tsuchiya's second single used in the series, the first being "Rose".

The B-side, a cover of the Depeche Mode song "Just Can't Get Enough" but with a different arrangement, was used in a TV commercial for the Nissan March.

Track listing

References

2007 singles
Anna Tsuchiya songs
2007 songs
Avex Trax singles